Silao may refer to:

Places
Silao, a city in the Mexican state of Guanajuato
Silao, Guanajuato, a municipality, the seat of Silao
Silao, Nalanda, a town in Nalanda district, Bihar, India
Silao railway station

People
Silao Leaega (Silao Leaegailesolo) (born 1973), former Samoan rugby union player
Silao Malo (born 1990), Samoan footballer 
Silao Vaisola Sefo (born 1979), Samoan rugby union player